National Theatre Live is an initiative operated by the Royal National Theatre in London, which broadcasts live via satellite, performances of their productions (and from other theatres) to cinemas and arts centres around the world.

About
I grew up in Manchester in the 60s. If I had been able to see Olivier's National Theatre at my local cinema, I would have gone all of the time.
— Nicholas Hytner, director of the Royal National Theatre.

The programme began its pilot season in June 2009 with a production of Phèdre, starring Helen Mirren, which screened live in 70 cinemas across the UK. Two hundred more venues eventually showed the production internationally, resulting in a combined audience of around 50,000 people for this one performance. The second production, All's Well That Ends Well, showed at a total of around 300 screens, and today, the number of venues that show NT Live productions has grown to around 700.

With the exception of a Saturday matinee for Nation, a Monday evening showing for London Assurance, and a Tuesday evening showing for A Streetcar Named Desire, all National Theatre Live productions have been broadcast on a Thursday evening, to avoid conflicting with cinemas' weekend schedules. Most venues screen the productions live as they are broadcast, but because of the time differences in South Africa, Australia, New Zealand, and the United States venues in those countries show the recorded production some days later. Many venues also offer repeat screenings of popular productions which they term 'Encores'.

Most productions broadcast are plays performed in repertory at the Royal National Theatre, but works by other companies have been included. A Disappearing Number by Complicite was broadcast live from the Theatre Royal, Plymouth on 14 October 2010. The Donmar Warehouse's production of King Lear, starring Derek Jacobi was broadcast live from Covent Garden on 3 February 2011. In the summer of 2013, a broadcast of Macbeth starring Kenneth Branagh and Alex Kingston was broadcast live from the Manchester International Festival on 20 July 2013. A Streetcar Named Desire starring Gillian Anderson was broadcast live from the Young Vic on 16 September 2014.

Live broadcasts

Live performances are broadcast live from the National Theatre (unless noted). They are certified differently from feature films.

Season 1

Phedre – 25 June 2009
All's Well That Ends Well – 1 October 2009
Nation – 30 January 2010
The Habit of Art – 22 April 2010
London Assurance – 28 June 2010

Season 2

A Disappearing Number – 14 October 2010
Hamlet – 9 December 2010
Fela! – 13 January 2011
King Lear – 3 February 2011
Frankenstein – 17 & 24 March 2011
The Cherry Orchard – 30 June 2011

Season 3

One Man, Two Guvnors – 15 September 2011
The Kitchen – 6 October 2011
Collaborators – 1 December 2011
Travelling Light – 9 February 2012
The Comedy of Errors – 1 March 2012
She Stoops to Conquer – 29 March 2012

Season 4
The Curious Incident of the Dog in the Night-Time – 6 September 2012
The Last of the Haussmans – 11 October 2012
Timon of Athens – 1 November 2012
The Magistrate – 17 January 2013
People – 21 March 2013
This House – 16 May 2013
The Audience – 13 June 2013 (broadcast from the Gielgud Theatre in the West End)
Macbeth – 20 July 2013 (broadcast from the Manchester International Festival)

Season 5
Othello – 26 September 2013
Coriolanus – 30 January 2014 (broadcast from the Donmar Warehouse)
War Horse – 27 February 2014 – (National Theatre production broadcast from the New London Theatre in the West End)
King Lear – 1 May 2014
A Small Family Business – 12 June 2014
Skylight – 17 July 2014 (broadcast from Wyndham's Theatre in the West End)

Season 6
Medea – 4 September 2014 
A Streetcar Named Desire – 16 September 2014
JOHN – 9 December 2014
Treasure Island – 22 January 2015
Behind the Beautiful Forevers – 12 March 2015
A View from the Bridge – 26 March 2015 (The Young Vic production broadcast from Wyndham's Theatre in the West End)
The Hard Problem – 16 April 2015
Man and Superman – 14 May 2015
Everyman – 16 July 2015

Season 7
The Beaux' Stratagem – 3 September 2015
Hamlet – 15 October 2015 (broadcast from the Barbican Theatre)
Of Mice and Men – 19 November 2015 (broadcast from the Longacre Theatre on Broadway, New York)
Jane Eyre – 8 December 2015
Les Liaisons Dangereuses – 28 January 2016 (broadcast from the Donmar Warehouse)
As You Like It – 25 February 2016
Hangmen – 3 March 2016 (Royal Court production broadcast from Wyndham's Theatre in the West End)

Season 8
The Deep Blue Sea – 1 September 2016
The Threepenny Opera – 22 September 2016
No Man's Land – 15 December 2016 (broadcast from Wyndham's Theatre in the West End)
Amadeus – 2 February 2017
Saint Joan – 16 February 2017 (broadcast from the Donmar Warehouse)
Hedda Gabler – 9 March 2017
Twelfth Night – 6 April 2017
Rosencrantz and Guildenstern Are Dead – 20 April 2017 (broadcast from The Old Vic)
Obsession – 11 May 2017 (broadcast from the Barbican Theatre)
Who's Afraid of Virginia Woolf? – 18 May 2017 (broadcast from the Harold Pinter Theatre in the West End)
Peter Pan – 10 June 2017 (performance was captured during its run at the National Theatre over the Christmas 2016/17 season)
Salomé – 22 June 2017
Angels in America, Part One: Millennium Approaches – 20 July 2017
Angels in America, Part Two: Perestroika – 27 July 2017
Yerma – 31 August 2017 (broadcast from The Young Vic)

Season 9 
Follies – 16 November 2017
 Young Marx – 7 December 2017 (production broadcast from the Bridge Theatre)
 Cat on a Hot Tin Roof – 22 February 2018 (The Young Vic production broadcast from the Apollo Theatre)
 Julius Caesar – 22 March 2018 (production broadcast from the Bridge Theatre)
 Macbeth – 10 May 2018

Season 10 
 Julie – 6 September 2018
 King Lear – 27 September 2018 (Chichester Festival Theatre production broadcast from the Duke of York's Theatre)
Allelujah! - 1 November 2018
 The Madness of George III – 20 November 2018 (broadcast from the Nottingham Playhouse)
Antony & Cleopatra – 6 December 2018
The Tragedy of King Richard the Second – 15 January 2019 (broadcast from the Almeida Theatre)
I'm Not Running – 31 January 2019 
All About Eve – 11 April 2019 (broadcast from the Noël Coward Theatre)
All My Sons – 14 May 2019 (broadcast from The Old Vic; due to a competing Broadway production then under way, North American streaming was postponed until a later date)
Small Island – 27 June 2019
The Lehman Trilogy – 25 July 2019

Season 11 

Fleabag – 12 September 2019 (a Soho Theatre production, broadcast from the Wyndham's Theatre)
A Midsummer Night's Dream – 17 October 2019 (broadcast from the Bridge Theatre)
Hansard – 7 November 2019
Present Laughter – 28 November 2019 (broadcast from The Old Vic)
Cyrano de Bergerac – 20 February 2020 (broadcast from Playhouse Theatre)
The Welkin –  Cancelled due to UK Theatre closures relating to the 2020 COVID-19 Pandemic 
Leopoldstadt –  Cancelled due to UK Theatre closures relating to the 2020 COVID-19 Pandemic
Jack Absolute Flies Again –  Cancelled due to UK Theatre closures relating to the 2020 COVID-19 Pandemic

Season 12 
Leopoldstadt – 27 January 2022 (broadcast from the Wyndham's Theatre)
The Book of Dust – 17 February 2022 (broadcast from the Bridge Theatre)
Henry V – 21 April 2022 (broadcast from the Donmar Warehouse)
Straight Line Crazy – 26 May 2022 (broadcast from the Bridge Theatre)
Prima Facie – 21 July 2022 (broadcast from the Harold Pinter Theatre)
Much Ado About Nothing – 8 September 2022
Jack Absolute Flies Again – 6 October 2022
The Seagull - 3 November 2022 (broadcast from the Harold Pinter Theatre)

Season 13 
The Crucible - 26 January 2023
Othello - 23 February 2023
Life of Pi - 30 March 2023
GOOD - 20 April 2023
Best of Enemies - 18 May 2023

See also
Metropolitan Opera Live in HD
Royal National Theatre
List of Royal National Theatre Company actors

References

External links
Official website

Theatre in the United Kingdom
Royal National Theatre